Goldridge College (or Goldridge) is a co-educational, independent, boarding and day senior school in Kwekwe, Zimbabwe. Opened in 2001, the school is located in the low-density suburb of Newtown and is in close proximity to Kwekwe Sports Club. The school is run by the Goldridge Schools Board of Governors, which similarly runs the nearby feeder school, Goldridge Primary.

Goldridge College is a member of the Association of Trust Schools (ATS).The headmaster is a member of the Conference of Heads of Independent Schools in Zimbabwe (CHISZ).

Academics
Goldridge College is a registered Cambridge International Examinations (CIE) centre. Students write the CIE Checkpoint, IGCSE, AS Level and A Level examinations.

Sport 
Students are expected to take part in at least one sport each term. Goldridge College offers numerous sports such as athletics, basketball, cross country, cricket, golf, hockey, netball, rugby, soccer, swimming, and tennis.

Clubs and Cultural Activities 
Goldridge College offers the following cultural activities: Drama, Debating, Quiz, Public Speaking, Elocution, Choir, Marimba band and Jazz band.

Goldridge College students are required to attend at least one club activity. The clubs offered include Youth Alive, Chess, Interact, Library, Debate and Public Speaking, Information Communication Technology and Media(discontinued), Grooming, Interact, Leo Club, Instrumental Music, Scripture Union, Art, SETA Engineering, Young Artists Poetry Society, and Mathematics Olympiad.

Alumni 
Most of Goldridge College's alumni go on to further their education at tertiary level. Some alumni have been accepted to prestigious universities such as Columbia University in the City of New York, Massachusetts Institute of Technology and the University of Cape Town.

Alumni who have attended Goldridge Primary School and Goldridge College are usually referred to as 'Goldridgians'.

See also

 List of schools in Zimbabwe
 List of boarding schools

References

External links
  Official website
  on the ATS website
  on Facebook
  on Twitter

Schools in Harare
Private schools in Zimbabwe
Co-educational schools in Zimbabwe
Cambridge schools in Zimbabwe
Day schools in Zimbabwe
Boarding schools in Zimbabwe
High schools in Zimbabwe
Educational institutions established in 2001
2001 establishments in Zimbabwe
Member schools of the Association of Trust Schools
Kwekwe